First album of Polish hardcore punk rock band Eye for an Eye

Track listing
"Labirynt"
"Konstrukcja prawa"
"Uciekać"
"Niech opowiedzą"
"Wspomnienia"
"Wiemy"
"Na pewno"
"Betonowy świat"
"S.I.K."
"Outro"

Personnel
Anka - Vocals
Tomek - Guitar, Vocals
Bartek - Guitar, Vocals
Damian - Bass, Vocals
Rafał - Drums

Resources
Band's official site

2002 albums
Eye for an Eye (band) albums